Desmond's Trashed Apple Tree is a 2004 Swedish animated short film directed by Magnus Carlsson.

Cast 
Anna Blomberg as Bittan Ko / Fru Krokodil (voice)
Sten Ljunggren as Narrator
Måns Nathanaelson as Sebastian Hare (voice)
Ola Rapace as Wille (voice)
Shanti Roney as Desmond (voice)
Rikard Wolff as Helmut Sebaot (voice)

References

External links 

2004 animated films
2004 films
2000s animated short films
Swedish animated short films
2000s Swedish-language films
2000s Swedish films